Boston (1833–1850) was an outstanding Thoroughbred racehorse and a leading sire in North America three times from 1851 to 1853. He started in about 45 races, winning 40, including 15 in succession. Boston was later one of the initial inductees into the Hall of Fame.

Breeding
He was a chestnut stallion with a white blaze on his nose, and he was foaled in Richmond, Virginia. Boston was bred by Virginia attorney John Wickham (who had been Aaron Burr's counsel in his trial for treason). He was by Timoleon (by the Sir Archy); his dam was a sister to Tuckahoe, by Ball's Florizel. Boston was inbred to Diomed in the third generation (3m x 3f). He was a half-brother to the Shylock mare who founded a successful family. They were from the number 40 family, which traced back to the imported mare Kitty Fisher.

Boston was described as "[A] glowing chestnut, with a blazed face and both hind ankles white; his coat being lustrous and satiny in texture. While well-shaped, the expression of his head and neck were such that they were often though coarse and ugly, which actually they were not. The eye was large and full, the ear small and well-placed and carried, the nostril flaring. His neck was of medium length and very clean at the throttle. He rose high on the withers, was deep-breasted and the shoulders obliquely laid. For a horse of his height his carcass was immense. He was slab-sided, flat-bodied and stood over a lot of ground, his back-ribs were wonderful and coupling arched with the power of suspension bridge, while his entire hind quarter was a prodigy of brawn and muscle. Boston was a heavy limbed horse, with knees and hocks let down close the ground and unusually short pasterns that were at the same time extremely flexible. No set of measurements seems ever to have been taken of him, but his forearm was abnormal in its size, as were his stifle and gaskin, his length from point of hip to point of hock superior to any other celebrity since American Eclipse. His fiery temperament alternately flamed and smouldered and from moods of passion he would lapse into inert, sluggish ones, but at all times he had the quickness of a cat when aroused which made his gigantic strength all the more formidable. Led out he usually dropped his head almost on a level with his withers; and at the beginning of a heat carried it so low that he seemed to stretch himself along the ground, but as the miles were put behind him and the climax came, would gradually lift it higher and higher and finish 'looking for horses.'"

As a two-year-old, Boston was lost by his breeder in a card game and was given to Wickham's friend Nathaniel Rives of Richmond to repay his debt of $800.  He was named after a popular card game and later given the nickname of "Old Whitenose". Boston had a wilful temperament and was difficult to train. He was sent to the stable of John Belcher, and then to the trainer L. White, and then back to Belcher. White said, "The horse should either be castrated or shot—preferably the latter."

Racing record
On April 20, 1836, he was entered into a sweepstakes in Richmond facing only a colt of White's.  Boston ran away with the race, gaining a long lead, only to stop halfway through, refusing to move. His rider dismounted and a heavier one, named Ned, mounted, who eventually got Boston moving again, but the other colt had crossed the wire and won while Boston was still balking on the back stretch.

After this race, Boston was given to Ned to use as a common hack in Richmond with an iron hand. Boston's temperament caused multiple wild scenes, but afterwards he was more amenable to a rider.

Back under saddle, Boston won fifteen races in succession. From Georgia to New York, he raced until he was a ten-year-old, winning 40 of his 45 starts. In those days, races weren't stakes, graded or otherwise, and they weren't run on specially prepared racecourses.  They were heats across open country and 30 of Boston's victories were in these four-miles heats, while another 9 wins were in three-mile heats. Boston had established himself as a great—if tempestuous—race horse and more than once, his then owner (Colonel W. R. Johnson, called the "Napoleon of the Turf") was paid good money not to race, in order to encourage other owners to enter their horses in an event.

Boston versus Fashion Match Race
The accepted wisdom is that Boston lost on his merit only once.  In May 1842, he met the filly Fashion, the daughter of Trustee and Bonnets o' Blue, in a well-touted match race at the Union Course on Long Island, New York. Seventy thousand people witnessed the event.  In the first heat, the nine-year-old Boston (carrying 126 pounds) cut open a long, jagged gash on his hip against a rail, and both he and five-year-old Fashion (carrying 111 pounds) were upset by the crowd often surging onto the track.  Boston led for three miles, but Fashion won by 60 yards, setting a new world record of 7:32½ for a four-mile heat. During the match he twice tried to savage Fashion.

Complete Race Record

Stud record
Boston was the leading sire in 1851, 1852 and 1853, and second in 1854 to Glencoe, beginning his stud career even before he raced against Fashion.  (He'd covered 42 mares before the match at $100 each.) During his race career he stood at the stable of W. R. Johnson, in Petersburg, VA. He stood at Spring Grove, Hanover County, Virginia for $70 in 1843, then in Washington, D.C. for $60 in 1844, 1845, and 1846, and was then led over the mountains to Kentucky where he spent his last seasons in Woodford County, Kentucky, standing for $50 in 1847-1849. He thus stood only eight full season. It was in Kentucky that he was finally bred with mares of good quality, which enabled him to become a leading sire.  His first progeny first raced in 1845 as three-year-olds. He was also a sire of trotters, producing Jay-Eye-See, the first trotter to reach 2:10 for a mile.

Boston eventually sired 95 winners of 293 races, including 26 at 4-mile heats and 61 at 3-mile heats. Some of Boston’s noted progeny were:
 Ringgold, an outstanding galloper and sire of Tipperary (sire of Belmont Stakes winner Calvin)
 Commodore, who became a good sire
 Attila, winner of five races in California and Oregon in 1860 and 17 over his career
 Red Eye, winner of 33 races, 11 at 4-mile heats and 13 at 3-mile heats
 Bostona, winner of 12 races, 2 at 4-mile heats and 6 at 3-mile heats, a noted racemare
 Arrow, winner of 10 races
 Wade Hampton, winner of 12 races
 Nina, an outstanding racehorse at distances from two to four miles and a notable broodmare. dam of Planet, Exchequer, Algerine, Ecliptic, Ninette, etc.
 Madeline, dam of Maggie B. B., who produced three American classic winners: Iroquois, Panique and Harold
 Lexington, foaled in 1850 after Boston's death. He was the greatest American racehorse of his era and became the leading sire for 16 years. Lexington maintained Boston's sire-line through Norfolk 1861—Emperor Of Norfolk 1885—Americus 1892 to Golden Rod (GB) 1906. Lexington's offspring captured a record seven Classic races as well as a nine Travers Stakes races.
 Lecomte, won 16 races and was the only horse to ever beat Lexington

By 1849, Boston was blind and in such poor health he could stand only with the aid of a harness.  He was found dead in his stall, still warm, on January 31, 1850, blind and emaciated from illness.  The stall and his body were splattered with blood, presumably from thrashing in his final moments. His two best sons, Lexington and Lecomte, were born in the spring after his death.

Boston was one of the first groups of horses inducted into the National Museum of Racing and Hall of Fame in 1955.

Pedigree 

Boston was inbred 3 x 3 to Diomed, meaning that this stallion appears twice in the third generation of his pedigree. Also, he was inbred 4 x 4 to Florizel due to him being the sire of the 3 x 3 inbreeding scenario.

See also
List of leading Thoroughbred racehorses

References

1833 racehorse births
1850 racehorse deaths
Racehorses trained in the United States
United States Thoroughbred Racing Hall of Fame inductees
Racehorses bred in Virginia
United States Champion Thoroughbred Sires
Byerley Turk sire line
Thoroughbred family 40